Volcano Songs is the tenth album by Meredith Monk, released on March 11, 1997 through ECM New Series.

Track listing

Personnel 
Musicians
Allison Easter – vocals (12), photography
Dina Emerson – vocals (12)
Katie Geissinger – vocals (1-4, 12)
Harry Huff – piano (5)
Meredith Monk – vocals
Nurit Tilles – piano (11)
Production
James A. Farber – engineering
Michael Hofstetter – design
Jan Erik Kongshaug – engineering
Tina Pelikan – production, photography

References 

1997 albums
ECM New Series albums
Meredith Monk albums